The Centenario Tower is a skyscraper office building in Santiago, the capital of Chile.

It was finished in 2000 and has 31 floors, of which 5 are basement. It has a floor area of 48,500m² and a height of 371 feet (112 metres).

See also
List of tallest buildings in Chile
List of tallest buildings in South America
List of tallest towers in the world

References

Skyscrapers in Chile
Buildings and structures in Santiago
Office buildings completed in 2000
Office buildings in Chile
Skyscraper office buildings